Hamish Kember (born 29 February 1968) is a New Zealand former cricketer. He played eight first-class matches for Canterbury between 1990 and 1995. He was also part of New Zealand's squad for the 1988 Youth Cricket World Cup.

References

External links
 

1968 births
Living people
New Zealand cricketers
Canterbury cricketers
Sportspeople from Canterbury